The  ISCR (Istituto Superiore per la Conservazione ed il Restauro: High Institute for Conservation and Restoration - formerly Istituto Centrale di Restauro: "Central Institute of Restoration - ICR") is a body of the Ministry of Cultural Heritage and Activities and tourism in Rome.  Together with the Opificio delle Pietre Dure in Florence, it is one of the most notable and prestigious institutes in the field of art restoration and art restoration instruction.

Since 1944 there has been a state school for art conservation training inside the Institute in Rome. Since 2006 its diploma is equivalent to a degree course, similar to a master's degree in the US. The courses are limited: to access one must pass an appropriate public contest announced by the Ministry of Heritage and Culture. The training lasts five years and the diploma is subject to the acquisition of 300 credits.  In this school they taught such important art historians as Cesare Brandi, and other scientists of conservation-restoration, such as microbiologist Clelia Giacobini.

References

See also 
 Conservation science
 List of dates in the history of art conservation
 Heritage Science

Cultural heritage of Italy
Conservation and restoration training